Jur Modo, also known as Jur or Modo, is a Central Sudanic language spoken by the Jur Modo people of South Sudan. Dialects are Lori, Modo (Jur Modo, Modo Lali), Wira, Wetu. It is a tonal language.

Phonology

Vowels

Consonants

References

Languages of Chad
Bongo–Bagirmi languages
Languages of South Sudan